San Fernando Formation may refer to:
 San Fernando Formation, Trinidad and Tobago, Paleogene geologic formation of Trinidad and Tobago
 San Fernando Formation, Colombia, Oligocene geologic formation of Colombia